Chester Lamar Hoover (February 27, 1887 — December 18, 1944) was an American football, basketball, and baseball coach. He served two stints as the head football at Fairmount College—now known as Wichita State University—in Wichita, Kansas, from 1916 and 1917 and again from 1921 to 1922 and as head football coach at Oklahoma City University from 1923 to 1924. Prior to coaching at Fairmount, Hoover attended Baker University, where he was regarded as one of their top athletes. In the 1906–07 basketball season, Hoover, described as "one of the outstanding guards of the midlands", lead the Baker team to an undefeated season, under coach Phog Allen.

Hoover's final season at Fairmont began promisingly but ended with disappointing losses.

Hoover was born in Peabody, Kansas and was a veteran of World War I. Hoover died on December 18, 1944, at Veterans' Hospital in Muskogee, Oklahoma.

Head coaching record

Football

References

External links
 

1887 births
1944 deaths
American men's basketball coaches
American men's basketball players
Baker Wildcats men's basketball players
Basketball coaches from Kansas
Basketball players from Kansas
Coaches of American football from Kansas
College men's basketball head coaches in the United States
Guards (basketball)
Oklahoma City Chiefs football coaches
Oklahoma City Stars men's basketball coaches
People from Marion County, Kansas
Wichita State Shockers baseball coaches
Wichita State Shockers football coaches
Wichita State Shockers men's basketball coaches